Bejís is a municipality in the comarca of Alto Palancia, province of Castellón, Valencian Community, Spain.

Notable people
Antonio Ponz (1725–1792), painter

References 

Municipalities in the Province of Castellón
Alto Palancia